V518 Carinae (HR 4196) is a naked-eye variable star in the constellation Carina.  It is a member of the bright open cluster IC 2602 near the Carina Nebula.

Location
V518 Carinae lies in the open cluster IC 2602, 5 arc minutes from its brightest member θ Carinae.

Variability

518 Carinae was discovered to change in brightness after analysis of Hipparcos photometry.  The amplitude of the variations seen is 0.2 magnitudes, with possible periods of 100 and 971 days.  It is classified as a γ Cassiopeiae variable.

Spectral peculiarities
V518 Carinae is classified as a B-type main sequence star between B3 and B5.  It is also catalogued as a helium star, a chemically peculiar star with abnormally strong helium absorption lines in its spectrum and relatively weak hydrogen lines.  It is possibly a blue straggler.

V518 Carinae is also a Be star, a hot star with emission lines in its spectrum due to a disk of material around the star.  Be stars that show irregular brightness changes due to the disk are grouped as γ Cassiopeiae variables.  V518 Carinae is known to produce disk outbursts lasting several hundred days.

References

B-type main-sequence stars
Blue stragglers
Carina (constellation)
Carinae, V518
Durchmusterung objects
092938
4196
052370
IC 2602
Gamma Cassiopeiae variable stars